William Brittelle (born 1977) is a North Carolina-born, Brooklyn-based composer of genre-fluid electro-acoustic music. Also active as a producer and curator, Brittelle is co-founder/co-artistic director of New Amsterdam Records with composers Sarah Kirkland Snider and Judd Greenstein and the curatorial collective Infinite Palette with producer Kate Nordstrum and composer Daniel Wohl.

Early life and education
Brittelle was raised in rural North Carolina, and often cites his upbringing in a small southern town with a conservative Christian environment as in opposition to his Brooklyn-based, agnostic Buddhist adulthood, a dissonance reflected in his musical output. Though a trained composer and orchestrator, he has often expressed frustration and dissolution with the world of academia and the classical industry in general. In undergrad, while enrolled at Vanderbilt University as a composition major, Brittelle experienced what he has referred to as a psychotic break, in part as a result of academic artistic constrictions, resulting in him briefly dropping out of school. He has claimed this breakdown, and his subsequent recovery, to be a formative experience in the development of his collage-based, non-developmental, genre-fluid style of composition. After being enrolled in a D.M.A. program at the Graduate Center of the City University of New York for a period of two years, Brittelle dropped out and re-enrolled privately with his primary teacher, Pulitzer Prize-winning composer David Del Tredici, for two subsequent years as a non-matriculating student. In addition to Del Tredici, Brittelle's musical mentors have included Mike Longo (longtime pianist/arranger for Dizzy Gillespie), and punk guitarist Richard Lloyd of Television.

After dropping out of graduate school, Brittelle found himself attracted to pop, hip-hop, and punk music as a way of connecting more viscerally with an audience. This led to fronting a New York post-punk band and working at Sin-e, a heralded New York City music venue on the Lower East Side of Manhattan. However following a severe vocal injury he returned to composition, armed with the desire to incorporate disparate and oppositional influences into one vision. Brittelle has stated that his first album "Mohair Time Warp"  written in the wake of his vocal injury, is the first example of work that represented the full breadth of his musical vision.

Career

His work has been praised on NPR's All Things Considered and in many other major outlets, including the New York Times (Sunday Arts & Leisure), The Nation, the Los Angeles Times, MUSO, the Oxford Culture Review, and Wisconsin Public Radio. The New Yorker labeled Brittelle as “a mercurial artist whose oeuvre embraces post-punk flamboyance, chamber music elegance, and much more.” Classical TV has stated: “William Brittelle is creating a body of work that has no precedent, and marks him as one of the most promising heirs of the vital American maverick tradition.” Furthermore, Amid the Minotaurs, a piece commissioned and premiered by vocal ensemble Roomful of Teeth, was featured on the group's Grammy-winning debut album.

Brittelle's discography includes Loving the Chambered Nautilus, a series of electro-acoustic chamber music pieces melding classic synthesizer sounds and drum programming with virtuosic and textured classical composition written for ACME (the American Contemporary Music Ensemble). The album was featured by NPR's All Things Considered, and Nautilus hit #1 on Amazon's Chamber Music Chart. The New York Times labeled the work “bright and joyous,” and MUSO dubbed it “a fast, fun, freedom-fueled flurry of a record.”

Previous to Nautilus, Brittelle released Television Landscape, his fully composed, post-apocalyptic art rock concept album scored for orchestra, rock band, synths, and children's choir. Dubbed “irresistible” by the New York Times and “a glorious reclamation of lush sounds crusty critics have vilified for years” by Time Out New York, Television Landscape drew substantial praise from both rock and classical critics, leading the Los Angeles Times to say, “You might wonder if Jane’s Addiction had discovered the soul of Debussy.” eMusic called the album “expansive, anthemic, all-encompassing, shot through with raw emotion” and named it to its "Albums of the Year" list. The album's centerpiece, the nostalgia-soaked soft rock ballad "Sheena Easton," was singled out by PopMatters for its “complex orchestrations” and “mind-bending arrangements.” The Believer magazine chose the album's closing track "The Color of Rain" for inclusion in its prestigious annual music issue.

Brittelle's compositions have been presented at venues across the world, including the Hollywood Bowl in Los Angeles, the Kennedy Center, Teatro Colón in Buenos Aires, the Metropolitan Museum of Art, Da Camera in Houston, Seattle's Town Hall, the Ecstatic Music Festival in New York, the Kahserne in Switzerland, the Gothenburg Symphony Chamber Series in Sweden, the Freemantle Arts Center in Perth, and the Walker Art Center in Minneapolis. His music has been commissioned by the Seattle Symphony, the Indianapolis Symphony, the Baltimore Symphony, the North Carolina Symphony, the Walker Art Center, the Liquid Music Series, the Alabama Symphony, Mass MoCA, and the Basel Sinfonietta among others. Notable commissions include Love Letter for Arca, piece for synthesizer and orchestra, and Obituary Birthday, a requiem for Kurt Cobain, with the Seattle Symphony, Oh Albert: An LSD Oratorio for the Basel Sinfonietta, Psychedelics for Roomful of Teeth and full concert choir, and Dido's Lament Revisited for Wild Up and Zola Jesus for the Ecstatic Music Festival. Past collaborative works include orchestral arrangements for the bands Lower Dens and Wye Oak (band) and electronic artists Oneohtrix Point Never and Son Lux.

A further recent project includes Si Otsedoha (We're Still Here), a collaboration with the Easter Band of the Cherokee Indian and the North Carolina Symphony which serves as platform for a severely marginalized community to re-contextualize its suffering as strength, to connect with its oppressor in a proud and public way from a position of power. The work, commissioned by the Eastern Band in effort to create new art featuring the Cherokee language, premiered in October 2018 with a multi-date tour of North Carolina.

Brittelle has also been the recipient of grants and awards from the National Endowment of the Arts, American Music Center, American Composers Forum, the Jerome Foundation, the Foundation for Contemporary Arts, NYSCA, and ASCAP.  He formerly served on the faculty of The New School in New York City, developing and teaching courses in Post-Genre Music and the Ethos of Punk.

References

External links
William Brittelle
New Amsterdam Records
New York Times Profile
Interview with Jayson Greene

American male composers
21st-century American composers
Living people
21st-century American male musicians
1977 births